A stew is a combination of solid food ingredients that have been cooked in liquid and served in the resultant gravy. Ingredients can include any combination of vegetables and may include meat, especially tougher meats suitable for slow-cooking, such as beef, pork, venison, rabbit, lamb, poultry, sausages, and seafood. While water can be used as the stew-cooking liquid, stock is also common. A small amount of red wine or other alcohol is sometimes added for flavour. Seasoning and flavourings may also be added. Stews are typically cooked at a relatively low temperature (simmered, not boiled), allowing flavours to mingle.

Stewing is suitable for the least tender cuts of meat that become tender and juicy with the slow moist heat method. This makes it popular in low-cost cooking. Cuts having a certain amount of marbling and gelatinous connective tissue give moist, juicy stews, while lean meat may easily become dry.

Stews are thickened by reduction or with flour, either by coating pieces of meat with flour before searing, or by using a roux or beurre manié, a dough consisting of equal parts of fat and flour. Thickeners like cornstarch, potato starch, or arrowroot may also be used.

History

Stews have been made since ancient times. The world's oldest known evidence of stew was found in Japan, dating to the Jōmon period. Additionally, Herodotus says that the Scythians (8th to 4th centuries BC) "put the flesh into an animal's paunch, mix water with it, and boil it like that over the bone fire. The bones burn very well, and the paunch easily contains all the meat once it has been stripped off. In this way an ox, or any other sacrificial beast, is ingeniously made to boil itself."

Amazonian tribes used the shells of turtles as vessels, boiling the entrails of the turtle and various other ingredients in them. Other cultures used the shells of large mollusks (clams etc.) to boil foods in. There is archaeological evidence of these practices going back 8,000 years or more. 

There are recipes for lamb stews and fish stews in the Roman cookery book Apicius, believed to date from the 4th century AD. Le Viandier, one of the oldest cookbooks in French, written in the early 14th century by the French chef known as Taillevent, has ragouts or stews of various types in it.

The first written reference to 'Irish stew' is in Byron's "The Devil's Drive" (1814): "The Devil ... dined on ... a rebel or so in an Irish stew."

Types

Meat-based white stews also known as blanquettes or fricassées are made with lamb or veal that is blanched or lightly seared without browning, and cooked in stock. Brown stews are made with pieces of red meat that are first seared or browned, before a browned mirepoix and sometimes browned flour, stock and wine are added.

List of stews

 Baeckeoffe, a potato stew from Alsace
 Beef bourguignon, a French dish of beef stewed in red burgundy wine
 Bigos, a traditional stew in Polish cuisine
 Birria, a traditional stew from Mexico
 Bo Kho (Vietnamese: bò kho), a beef stew in rich seasonings, served with bread, noodle or plain rice from Vietnam
 Bollito misto, consisting of beef, veal, and pork simmered in an aromatic vegetable broth from Italy
 Booyah, an American meat stew
 Bosnian Pot, a stew with beef or lamb which is a national dish in Bosnia and Herzegovina
 Bouillabaisse, a fish stew from Provence
 Brongkos, a spicy Javanese meat with beans stew from Indonesia, made of Pangium edule, coconut milk, and various spices
 Brunswick stew, from Virginia and the Carolinas
 Burgoo, a Kentuckian stew
 Brudet, fish stew from Dalmatia regions, known in Greece as bourdeto
 Caldeirada, a fish stew from Portugal
 Carbonade flamande (Stoofvlees), a traditional Belgian beef and onion stew made with Belgian beer
 Cawl, a Welsh stew
 Chakapuli, a Georgian stew made with lamb chops, coriander and tarragon leaves, and white wine
 Chanakhi, a Georgian lamb stew with tomatoes, aubergines, potatoes, greens, and garlic
 Charquicán, a Chilean dish
 Chicken stew, whole chicken and seasonings
 Chicken paprikash, chicken stew with paprika
 Chili con carne, a meat and chili pepper stew originating in Texas
 Chilorio, a pork stew from Sinaloa, Mexico
 Cincinnati chili, developed by Macedonian immigrants from Greece immigrants in the Cincinnati area
 Cholent, a slow-cooked Jewish dish
 Chorba (also spelt "Shorba"), a stew like soup dish found in various North African, Middle Eastern, Central Asian, South Asian, and European cuisines
 Cochinita pibil, an orange color pork stew from Yucatán Peninsula, Mexico
 Cocido, a traditional Spanish and Portuguese strew with many variants (madrileño, montañés, à portuguesa, etc.)
 Cotriade, a fish stew from Brittany
 Cream stew, a yōshoku Japanese white stew
 Crow stew, a sour cream-based stew made with crow meat, popular in the United States during the Great Depression
 Daal, the Indian legume stew that has many varieties, a staple food throughout Asia
 Dalma, a traditional dish of Orrisha, India, contain pulses with vegetable
 Daube,  a French stew made with cubed beef braised in wine, vegetables, garlic, and herbs
 Dinuguan, pork blood stew from the Philippines
 Eintopf, (one pot) the German word for a stew: many different regional specialty recipes for Eintopf are known in Germany; for example, the Kassel area has a type called Lumben un Fleeh in the local dialect (Standard German: Lumpen und Flöhe – rags and fleas), which is quite similar to Irish stew. There are thicker German stews such as Hasenpfeffer or Labskaus; these would not usually be considered an Eintopf, though the technical difference is minor (longer cooking times and fewer vegetables)
 Ewedu, vegetable stew from Nigeria
 Fabada asturiana, an Asturian bean and meat stew
 Feijoada, Brazilian or Portuguese bean stew
 Fårikål, traditional Norwegian stew with lamb or mutton and white cabbage
 Főzelék, a thick Hungarian vegetable dish
 Gaisburger Marsch, a German dish of stewed beef served with Spätzle and potatoes
 Gheimeh, an Iranian stew with cubed lamb and yellow split peas
 Ghormeh sabzi, an Iranian stew with green herbs, dried limes, beans, and sheep meat
 Goulash, a Hungarian meat stew with paprika
 Gumbo, a Louisiana creole dish
 Hachee, a Dutch type of stew with wine or vinegar
 Haleem, an Indian-Pakistani lentil and beef stew
 Hasenpfeffer, a sour, marinated rabbit stew from Germany
 Hayashi rice, a Japanese dish of beef, onions and mushrooms in red wine and demi-glace sauce, served with rice
 Irish stew, made with lamb or mutton, potato, onion, and parsley
 Ishtu, a curry in Kerala, India made from chicken or mutton, potato, and coconut milk
 Istrian stew or yota, or jota, a dish popular in Croatian and Slovenian Istra and NE Italy
 I-tal Stew, a Rastafarian vegan dish of mostly Caribbean root vegetables and spices
 Jjigae, a diverse range of Korean stews
 Kaldereta, a goat meat stew from the Philippines
 Kalops, a traditional Swedish beef stew, with onions and carrots, served with potatoes and pickled beets
 Kare-kare, stewed beef or oxtail and vegetables in peanut sauce from the Philippines
 Karelian hot pot, from the region of Karelia in eastern Finland
Kharcho is a traditional Georgian soup containing beef, rice, cherry plum purée, and chopped walnuts 
 Khash, a traditional Armenian/Azerbaijani dish of pig's or cow's feet 
 Khoresht, a variety of  Persian stews, often prepared with saffron
 Kokkinisto, Greek stew with red meat, in a tomato passata with shallots, cinnamon, and other spices
 Kuurdak, a type of stew from Central Asia
 Lobscouse, a Norwegian stew with beef, potato, onion, and carrot
 Lancashire hotpot, an English stew
 Lecsó, a summertime favourite in Hungary, vegetable stew with bell pepper and tomato as main ingredients
 Linseneintopf ("lentil stew")
 Lobby, a stew from Staffordshire, England 
 Locro, a stew (mainly in the Andes region)
 Machanka, a Belarus and Ukraine pork stew
 Matelote, a French fish stew made with freshwater fish, fish stock, and wine
 Mechado, a Philippine beef stew
 Moppelkotze
 Moqueca, a Brazilian stew with fish (or shrimp, crab, or other seafoods) as its main ingredient
 Mućkalica, a Serbian stew
 Nihari, a Pakistani beef stew made overnight and served for breakfast
 Nikujaga, a Japanese beef and potato stew
 Oil down, national dish of Grenada, made of breadfruit, salted meat, chicken, dumplings, callaloo, coconut milk, spices
 Olla podrida, a Spanish red bean stew
 Pašticada, a Croatian stew from the region of Dalmatia
 Peperonata, an Italian stew made with peppers
 Pepposo, a Tuscan beef stew 
 Pescado Blanco, a white fish stew from Pátzcuaro, Michoacán, Mexico
 Pichelsteiner a traditional German stew
 Pörkölt, a Hungarian meat stew resembling goulash, flavoured with paprika
 Potjiekos, a South African stew
 Pot-au-feu, a simple French beef stew
 Pozole, a Mexican stew or soup
 Puchero, a stew from Andalusia, Spain, also common in South America and the Philippines
 Pulusu, is a form of stew from Andhra Pradesh in India that is typically sour and cooked with tamarind paste
 Ratatouille, a French vegetable stew
 Ragoût de Porc, a French pork stew
 Sambar, a thick vegetable stew, from South India
 Sancocho, a stew from the Caribbean
 Scouse, a stew commonly eaten by sailors throughout Northern Europe, popular in seaports such as Liverpool
 Semur, a typical Indonesian stew with beef or chicken, potatoes, carrots, various spices, and kecap manis (sweet soy sauce) from Indonesia
 Steckrübeneintopf (based on rutabaga)
 Slumgullion, a watery stew of meat and vegetables
 Tagine, a Moroccan stew, named after the conical pot in which it is traditionally cooked or served
 Tocană, a Romanian stew prepared with tomato, garlic, and sweet paprika
 Tharid, a traditional Arab stew of bread in broth
 Waterzooi, a Belgian stew
 Yahni, a Greek (γιαχνί), Turkish, and Persian stew

See also

 Braising
 Casserole
 Curry
 Hot pot
 Jugging
 List of foods
 Nabemono
 Perpetual stew
 Pottage
 Soup

References

External links

 Stew recipes. Food.com.
 Jäger-Eintopf (hunter's Stew) Recipe
 Recipe for Zürcher Eintopf

 
Cooking techniques
Culinary terminology
World cuisine
Types of food

de:Eintopf